Arthur T. Keller (June 11, 1921 – February 3, 1990) was an American football, basketball, and baseball coach.  He was the head football coach at Carthage College in Carthage, Illinois and Kenosha, Wisconsin, serving for 31 seasons, from 1952 until 1982, and compiling a record of 177–87–7.

His team had a 19-game winning streak from 1961 to 1963, the longest in the country at the time. Carthage named its football stadium "Keller Field" in his honor.

Keller died at the age of 68 in Racine, Wisconsin.

Head coaching record

College football

See also
 List of college football coaches with 30 seasons

References

1990 deaths
1921 births
Carthage Firebirds baseball coaches
Carthage Firebirds men's basketball coaches
Carthage Firebirds football coaches
High school basketball coaches in Illinois
High school football coaches in Illinois